The Audi Quattro Trophy was a golf tournament on the Challenge Tour. It was played from 1989 to 1998 in Germany.

Winners

References

External links
Coverage on the Challenge Tour's official site

Former Challenge Tour events
Golf tournaments in Germany
Recurring sporting events established in 1989
Recurring sporting events disestablished in 1998